La Rochelle Girls' High School, in Paarl is the oldest girls' school in South Africa (tied with Rhenish Girls' High School in Stellenbosch).

History
The school was established in 1860 with 40 girls together with a seminary for young ladies open to the daughters of citizens and farmers in the Paarl district. In 1872, Jan de Villiers (Jan Orrelis) became head of the school, which he renamed Paarl Meisieseminarium. He held the post until his retirement in 1890. Andrew Murray, a strong supporter of Afrikaans as a medium of instruction merged the Ladies' Seminary with the Huguenot Seminary he had founded in Wellington. An American, Virginia Lee Pryde, was appointed to the school administration and under her leadership the enrollment increased from 80 to 240 in 1899. Martha Helena Cillié, who had been acting head during 1894, was appointed head in 1899, and remained in that post until 1921. In 1913, the school was separated from the Huguenot High School, essentially an extension of Murray's Huguenot College in Wellington, and was given its current name. In 1914, two of the school's teachers were killed in one of the first fatal car accidents in Paarl. During the 1960s, approximately 400 people were forcibly evicted from their land in order to provide the school with about two hectares to be used as hockey fields. In 2009 enrollment had increased to 537.

Location
The high school is located at a site in Faure Street in the centre of Paarl.

Curriculum
The school is dual medium with an almost equal split between English and Afrikaans. Although school fees in 2007 were R9,830, cheaper than many other state schools, the school has kept a wide choice of subjects, for example, two third languages, namely German (one of only 28 schools in the Western Cape) and French (one of only 27). However, Latin is no longer offered, but a bible in Latin from 1762 is on display in the visitors' room of the school.

Notable alumnae
 Alba Bouwer, writer
 Elsa Joubert, writer
 Marguerite van Eeden, actress and photographer
 Joey de Koker, radio personality and actress.

Sources
 Schirmer, Peter. Die beknopte geïllustreerde ensiklopedie van Suid-Afrika, Central News Agency (Pty.) Ltd. Johannesburg, 1981.

References

External links
 The Western Cape's school information service 

Paarl
Girls' schools in South Africa
Schools in the Western Cape
Educational institutions established in 1860
1860 establishments in the Cape Colony
Bilingual schools in South Africa